Zavattini is a surname. Notable people with the surname include:

  (1928–1995), Italian politician 
 Arturo Zavattini (born 1930), Italian photographer and cinematographer
 Cesare Zavattini (1902–1989), Italian screenwriter and Neorealist theorist
 Emilio Zavattini (1927–2007), Italian physicist
 Jay Zavattini (born 2001)